Patience is a play written and published in 1998 by Jason Sherman (Doollie.com). It is about Reuben, who one day loses everything. The play follows a path similar to David Mamet's play Edmond. It traces a psychological journey through Reuben's head while he tries to figure out how everything happened. The play was written at a time when the story would hit home for a lot of middle-aged, middle-class men.

Play Synopsis

Act 1
The play opens with the lead character, Reuben, playing squash with Peter, a business partner. They get into an argument which causes Reuben to go to dinner by himself. At dinner an old friend named Paul comes into the restaurant and strikes up a conversation. Paul asks what Reuben would do if he lost everything, a question Reuben does not understand. Paul asks, “Do you have everything you need and do you need everything you have?” Reuben, who is still confused by the conversation, heads home. His wife, Donna, confronts him about love letters between him and another girl. He explains that they were from a long time ago, but she kicks him out of the house. Reuben then heads to a bar where he runs into another old friend, Mike, who tells him how he was just laid off. Reuben then recalls the conversation he had earlier with Paul, and mentions it to his friend at the bar who informs him that Paul had died in a plane crash a year ago heading to Vancouver. Reuben, shaken up by what Mike has told him, leaves the bar and goes to a pay phone to find Paul's home phone number. Sarah, Paul’s wife, answers and they reminisce about the how long it had been since they had seen each other. Reuben asks how she and Paul are doing and that is when she reveals that Paul had indeed died a year ago in a plane crash heading to Vancouver. The conversation ends there because Sarah is busy watching a movie with her kids. Reuben then receives a call almost immediately after he hangs up with Sarah from Peter telling him he needs to come to the office. When Reuben arrives he is confronted by Peter and two other colleagues, Frank and Janice, and is informed that he is going to be removed from the firm. They proceed to tell him that he was the reason they lost the Korean deal and that they knew he had stolen money from the company. Reuben attempts to explain but there is no use. They are not willing to negotiate, and they have already agreed that Reuben is fired.

Reuben calls Sarah again and insists that he must see her, and she agrees to meet in a half hour. After the conversation there is a flashback to the party at Sarah and Paul’s house when they had last seen each other. During the party it is revealed that the girl Reuben had been writing the love letters to was Sarah. At the party Paul walks in the room when Reuben and Sarah are kissing; he does nothing. Reuben knows that when Paul did nothing it was completely out of character and he is never able to get the image out of his head.

Returning to the present, Reuben is now at Sarah’s house. They talk about Paul but Reuben does not mention his encounter with him earlier that day. They talk about how Paul had begged Sarah to stay, which she did and then nine years later he told her that he was not happy anymore and was leaving for Vancouver to make movies. Sarah does most of the talking and Reuben leaves after he has no answer for her about whether Paul thought of her or his new lover in Vancouver. Later Reuben is back at his car when his phone rings. It is Phil, his brother. Phil is obviously rattled and is having trouble formulating his thoughts. Phil tells Reuben that Johnny, the third brother, was about to die and that he should come to Florida immediately. Reuben agrees and is on the next flight to Florida.

The next scene Phil has just picked up Reuben from the airport. There is a decent amount of traffic that allows them to have a lengthy conversation. During the drive Phil reveals that he is leaving his wife Mary for a student he was teaching. He thought this was always bound to happen: “Every year, I worry about this. Every year they get more gorgeous. Or maybe I get less picky.” He tells Reuben everything, about how they met, how they first went out for a drink, and how he fell in love with her right away. He asks Reuben if something like this had ever happened to him before. He mentions once but nothing ever came of it and before he has a chance to tell Phil of the details, Phil receives a call from his mother informing him that Johnny has died.

Act two

Scene One
Act two starts with Phil and his new girlfriend, Liz, at her place three months later. Reuben is still not at ease about the events of that day three months ago. Reuben wants so desperately to know what caused this train wreck of events. Reuben believes there should be a starting point where everything was set into motion, an exact moment. He can’t seem to find the moment and it haunts him. Phil tries to comfort him but Reuben isn't easily coaxed. Liz then enters the room and meets Reuben for the first time but leaves shortly to go skating. After Liz leaves, Reuben continues to talk about his philosophy of events and of life. “If I do this then I will get that” (Sherman 59). This is when Phil corrects Reuben and starts to explain chaos theory to him, even though Reuben does not want to hear it. Before Phil gets far Liz reenters, not being able to find her skate guards, and leaves quickly. Phil continues and tries to tell Reuben that he should not try to find the connections between events and that attempting to pinpoint the starting point would only drive him insane.   Reuben does not want to hear his theory and leaves.

Scene Two
Reuben is wandering around the city when he runs into a Rabbi who convinces him to come and perform a minyan. A minyan refers to a quorum required for certain obligations; it is usually done in public with ten men. On their way to the shul they find out that they knew each other when they were younger. He asks how his brothers were doing and Reuben informs him that Johnny had died. The Rabbi then seems to look into Reuben's soul. He sees the pain in Reuben and the asks the same questions Reuben has been repeating in his head and adds a few more for some perspective.

Although the rabbi feels the reason for Reuben's pain is his brother's passing he assists in helping Reuben find the answer. The rabbi tells Reuben why he did not recognize him as a Jew and tells a little bit of history about Jews as they arrive at the shul. When they arrive the rabbi takes him upstairs and leads him right to Sarah.

Scene Three
Reuben goes to Phil and Liz’s place to tell Phil of his encounter but only finds Liz. Phil is out on a run, so they make small talk for a while. They bounce through subjects about his drink, her skate guards, piano, when they finally move onto the subject of physics where Liz tries to explain chaos theory in a different way by telling him a story about a butterfly. “A butterfly leaves a tree somewhere, and it stirs the air, which effects the wind, which causes turbulence, which brings down a passenger jet” (Sherman 73). Reuben likes this analogy and superimposes his story right on top. He does not fully understand because he still feels like he controls his own destiny and that his actions mean something, but Liz explains that the decisions he make have an effect; he just cannot predict what that effect will be. They come to a stalling point in their conversation about what happened to Reuben, so Reuben asks her to play the piano for him and she does.

Scene Four
Sarah and Reuben are at a restaurant when Reuben tells Sarah about his encounter with Paul before they talked on that fateful day. They find out that this encounter was stranger than it seemed as everything he told Reuben about his life was in fact true. They come to the same question that Paul left both of them: “Do you need everything you have?”  There are three other characters in this scene: a man, a woman and a man on the phone. They seem to almost be reacting to the events of Reuben's life. The man and woman are fighting about the man cheating on her and the man on the cell phone is talking about taking money from his company that he built from the ground up. Reuben still wants to know how this whole thing started and Sarah attempts to explain that things do just happen for no rhyme or reason. Sarah goes with him on this journey to find out where everything started going wrong, and during the process confesses that she would have run away with him if he had called. Reuben felt the same but both were too afraid to make the first move. Sarah comes to the conclusion that the time they kissed at the party ten years ago started everything. It caused Paul to finally leave Sarah and die on the plane. Then all the characters but Reuben start singing to Reuben about love and that tomorrow may never come. Sarah and Reuben continue their conversation. Sarah asks if he has moved on and started working again, but he has not. She offers a job to him as a new challenge. They start talking about "what ifs" and why they never called each other. They discover that they still have some of those feelings for each other and that they were real to both of them at one time.

Scene Five
Reuben goes back to Phil and Liz’s place, this time looking for Liz. She is playing the piano and says she has written something for him, something goofy. He tells Liz that he has started dating Sarah, the girl from the past and that even though he fell in love with her ten years ago he cannot stop thinking of someone else. He does not understand how he can think of someone else when he is finally with the woman he wanted to spend his entire life with. Liz asks if he has told the other woman. Reuben has not, but he feels that she knows. Through the dialog it is almost apparent that Liz is the other woman. Reuben asks her to play the song; she starts but can't finish and bangs her hand on the piano. Phil shows up back from his run completely out of breath, gasping, and asking for water.  Reuben tells Phil about dating Sarah, which excites Phil. Phil then reveals that he and Liz had just bought a house. When Liz leaves the room, though, he reveals that he ran into Mary, his ex-wife, and now does not feel the same about Liz.

Scene Six
Reuben is at the subway when he sees Donna waiting as well. They begin talking and Reuben asks if she would like to go to a coffee shop. They ask how each other have been and Donna tells how she has met someone new, Bob. She has started on her masters, a book club, and a bunch of other endeavors. Reuben notes that she used to be that way when they were younger and that is who he fell in love with. She feels that it was his fault that she became someone different, that he smothered her. Donna told him how he never let her win an argument and never listened to what she had to say.  After she is done ripping into him she mentions that the kids would like to see him, Reuben says he will call.

Scene Seven
Reuben and Sarah have gone over to Phil and Liz’s for dinner. Sarah and Phil are looking at photos of the new house while Reuben sits to the side drinking and thinking about Donna. He remembers when they bought their first house and when they first conceived a baby. Sarah leaves to go check on her kids. Phil tells Reuben how great Sarah is and lucky he is to have her. Reuben does not seem too convinced. They talk about the time when a group of them went up to the cabin with their wives. They have different accounts of the time there. Phil remembers it as wonderful, while Reuben thought it was awful. Phil then leaves to go check on dinner. Liz, who is celebrating her birthday that evening, enters with a new drink for Reuben. Liz does not like where they left off the last time they talked. Reuben seems to be getting annoyed with the subject. She seems to think that Reuben is getting to a better situation. Reuben is moving to another direction during the conversation and keeps referring to Liz as a child. Sarah then enters the room unnoticed about halfway through the conversation when Liz and Reuben kiss. Reuben backs away saying he is no good for anyone that he will suck the life out of her. Liz tries to convince him that she cares for him but he will not take it. Reuben goes back to the pinpoint of when everything started going wrong in his life and he has come up with a new theory, his birth. He feels the only thing one can do is wait out their life, wait "out the darkness” (Sherman 107). He feels you should live your life alone out of respect for others.

Phil enters with some bread for an appetizer and tells Liz to go keep stirring the dinner. Liz leaves and they talk about how amazing Liz is that she can accomplish so much with her nerve disease. Sarah suggests going and getting the tapenade for the bread, and Phil leaves to go get it. Sarah then confronts Reuben about the kiss. Reuben talks about jumping out the window and goes to it and stares out it. He then flashes back to the party ten years ago. Phil, Paul and Donna enter the room. It is later in the party when Phil has come to a revelation. He explains that it came to him while he was outside taking a piss. Phil sees that we are all just particles floating around looking for an attachment. We will always be alone in the end so while we are here we can wait it out until the end, alone or cherish the fact that we are here and surround ourselves with the people we love. Phil has decided to do that later. It goes back to present time and Reuben answers “I know” (Sherman 113). And the play ends.

Play Analysis

This type of play became known as a well-made-play.  However, in "Patience," Jason Sherman takes viewers and readers to a non-linear route using flashbacks of the past, mainly a party ten years ago, which help give insight to the play's direction. The flashbacks help viewers understand the characters' thought processes and give answers to questions one might have about their lives. For example, when it is revealed that Sarah was the girl Reuben had written those letters to. With those flashbacks it is easy to see the seven components of a well-made-play. The order of these is as follows:
1. State of equilibrium-Reuben is a successful businessman and has a happy marriage with two kids.
2. Inciting incident- A friend from the past comes to visit Reuben while at dinner. He asks Reuben if he is happy and what he would do if he lost everything? He leaves Reuben with a final question, “Do you need everything you have?”
3. Point of Attack or Major Dramatic Question- Reuben does lose everything, he gets fired, his wife leaves him, and his brother dies. The question is then what will he do if he lost everything?
4. Rising action- This takes place three months later, why? Because his state of mind during those three months had not changed. Reuben has many talks with his brother Phil, Sarah, Liz, and a Rabbi about finding the point that started all of this. Why did this happen to him. Each character’s opinion and conversation helps him on his journey but leads to more question.
5. Climax- He runs into Donna at the subway. They have a lengthy conversation where she blames Reuben for all the troubles. Reuben had been looking for someone else to blame the whole time and never looked at himself. This is the first time he finally sees who was really to blame.
6. Resolution – He is coming to grips with the fact that it was his fault. He uses the starting point for when everything started going wrong as when he was born. It is apparent that he really took what Donna said to heart because he quotes her while talking to Liz. “I will suck the life out of you”
7. New state of equilibrium-At the end of the play Reuben says “I know” as a response to the end of a monologue by Phil in a flash back from the party. The basic outcome was that we are all alone and can either wait alone in the darkness or share our love with
the ones that love us. Although it seems that Reuben has chosen the first route of being alone.

Character Guide
Reuben- He is the Protagonist. He travels along Freytag’s Pyramid while dealing with all that has happened to him.
Donna- This is Reuben's wife. She finds the love letters between Reuben and Sarah and leaves Reuben. As well, she acts as the instigator in the climax. She puts Reuben in his place.
Phil-he is Reuben's brother, and is support for Reuben throughout the play. He is the person Reuben goes to when he has questions that he needs answers to.
Liz- is Phil’s new girlfriend. She is a talented 19/20 year old. She is there for Reuben when Phil is not around; they fall for each other a little. She writes him a song, paints him a picture. They eventually kiss, but Reuben turns her away.
Sarah- was the love interest of Reuben many years before, and was the one who wrote the love letters back and forth with Reuben. They date again but it never was the same.
Paul- is Reuben's old friend and Sarah’s husband, who acts as the inciting incident. After their encounter Reuben finds out that he had died in a plane crash a year before.
Rabbi- he knew Reuben and his family as a young boy. He is able to really give much insight into how Reuben is feeling and leads him unknowingly right to Sarah.
Peter- is Reuben's business partner and seems to be the main instigator within the situation of getting Reuben fired. He dislikes Reuben a lot and tries to get Reuben to fight him while they are telling Reuben he is being let go.
Frank- The chairman of Reuben's company, he seems like he does not want to fire Reuben but sees no other choice.
Janice-The accountant for Reuben's business, she find the discrepancy in Reuben's spending and feels that he is stealing from the company.

Character Analysis
Reuben is the Protagonist of our story. He is a wealthy business man who is so caught up in himself that he cannot see the events that are going to happen to him. Reuben's story follows a similar one of a David Mamet play called Edmond. Edmond is also a middle-class man who loses everything. Edmond's path to redemption is a much more violent and physical one as he deals with his feeling on race and homosexuality. Reuben's situation is much more a path through his mentality. He is obsessed with finding out why and how all these events got started. It takes the entire play for him to finally come to a peace although it is a very negative one. Reuben may be seen as the average middle class man and therefore his story can really hit home to a lot of people. Although his outcome is not one to hope for, the viewers are able to see his mistakes and misguided thought and learn from them. Phil, Liz and Sarah act as Reuben's confidants; he goes to them and tells them about his troubles. They try to help him but Reuben will not accept their advice. Paul acts as the messenger; he brings the warning of what is to come by acting as the force behind the inciting incident. Within this story there is a dialogue that has a ton of foreshadowing in it. Sherman also comes up with Reuben's final thought on life. That we are all alone and we can either wait in the darkness, which is the route that Reuben has chosen, or embrace that we are here and share our love with the ones that love us. The comic relief comes in the form of the rabbi. Although the rabbi does give viewers insight on how Reuben must be feeling, he reveals it in a comical manner. For example, when he calls Yahweh from his cell phone to find the answer to what is the point of being good.

Genre
This play falls under the genre of a classic tragedy. It starts with a state of equilibrium where there is a basic moral code. In Patience it is if you do your work you will be rewarded. Reuben worked hard at his job and became successful. He had a girl fall in love with him and they got married and had kids. Then the inciting incident happens when a character commits an act of shame. Reuben's business partners find that he has stolen from the company and his wife finds love letters to another woman. The plot develops as the character undergoes suffering. Reuben's brother dies and everywhere he searches for answers he is not able to find any. At the climax, the character receives some insight. Reuben runs into his ex-wife at the subway where she shows him how he is the reason for all that has gone wrong in his life. Not something or someone else. At the resolution the universal code is restored by some act of redemption. Reuben does not go through some act of redemption but he understands that because of his actions he deserves to be alone and that is what he intends to do.

Style
Jason Sherman wrote Patience mainly in a realist style.  These scenes happen in real time; although he jumps from scene to scene each individual scene takes as long as it would in real time. The characters do not go to unrealistic places; they remain in the actual real world except for Reuben's encounter with Paul. This play stays on one storyline, Reuben is the main character and the play follows his path. The audience is an objective one; we are viewing the play from afar and are not involved in the story. It also follows a real issue of storyline, the time. This play was written in 1998 and is about a successful businessman who loses everything. Something that could be very possible in that time and especially in the world today. The play does not give the audience a fairytale ending. It ends with Reuben finally coming to grips with the fact that he is at fault for all the bad events in his life. Although most realist plays run in chronological order, other realist plays do not and are still considered realism because their scenes seem to fit together correctly in the order presented. This is true for Patience as there are flashbacks but at very strategic points that give the audience insight into why things have just happened as they did. In Patience there are elements of absurdism. Reuben, within his mentality is living in a world full of absurdism. He is at the mercy of a higher power, whatever that might be. By the end of the play he comes to terms that his life cannot be changed. A quote from A Student's Guide to Play Analysis demonstrates how much the theatre of absurd is involved: “The purpose of writing, therefore, is simply to express their despair and perhaps to share it with others; to find in a sense, comfort in knowing that they are not alone in realizing that they are in fact, completely alone” (Rush 232). This is almost the exact realization that Reuben finds at the end. Patience can also be seen as a postmodern play. Sherman gives the audience many thought-provoking monologues where characters explain their ideas on whether individuals control their destiny or that their actions have no barring on outcomes. The audience is faced with the question if all events connect or if they just happen randomly. The play focuses on the dialogue of the play and less on the story. The message of the play can be seen in those monologues. The play's structure does not go through chronological order it focuses on how closely the scenes are tied together.

Theme
The central question in this play is, "Are you happy with your life?" This is the concept that is present throughout the play. The long monologues try to give rhyme or reason to what has caused these tragic events in Reuben's life. But they are simply ways to try to help him cope with his losses. This play really makes one examine one's life and analyze what went wrong and why, to see if they are really happy with their life. It asks the audience questions like, do you have everything you need and do you need everything you have? If you were to lose everything you had tomorrow would you be able to cope? Reuben comes as a prime example of what not to do. He is overly self-centered and therefore he tries to blame everyone else. He never looks at himself and when he finally does at the end of the play he cannot bear it. The point is that one is not able to control every outcome of life whether events are connected or not. People must be able to be happy with themselves and the outcomes will not matter. Another theme to this play could be how in 1997 a study was produced with findings that revealed that Jewish men had depression rates twice as high as non-Jewish men. The study's reasons were due to alcohol but others came up with other conclusions. One in particular fits this play very well.  “Dr. Susan Nolen-Hoeksema has attributed the greater susceptibility to depression to their more ruminative style of coping when distressed… it may explain the vulnerability to depression in Jewish men, whose religious training reinforces a ruminative quest for knowledge” (Why are Jewish…) Reuben is obsessed with finding an answer; his inability to find that answer leads him farther and farther down the path of depression.

Language
The language in this play moves from fast to slow. It goes from fast paced dialogues to slower monologues. In the normal conversations the characters are often interrupting each other. Quickly moving through their conversations as if they know what the other is going to say. It slows back down when one character really has something important to say. Sherman also uses singing within the dialogues. Those lines give a little insight on what is to come. The singing also attempts to hint at Reuben to see what he is missing. “So baby love me/ Love me tonight…Tomorrow was made for some/but tomorrow may never come” (Sherman 81). This is first heard when Reuben and Sarah are having dinner and it seems to be foreshadowing their romantic relationship. But it is also heard later in the play and could be seen as a call to Reuben to focus on the present.

Spectacle
In the playwright's notes Jason Sherman states “this play can and ought to be staged with elegance and simplicity. The first production features a multi-use set piece which became a car, a table in a restaurant, a desk and whatever else it was required to be.” (Sherman) It is not what is surrounds the characters that affects the audience, it is what the characters say that is the real spectacle. The play intrigues the audience to think about their lives and it does so by painting a picture with words.

Music
"For All we Know" is heard throughout the play. It is a song about living in and taking advantage of the present, centering on the lyrics "For tomorrow may never come". It falls within the constant message of the play, of being happy in one's own life.

Production history
Patience made its debut at the Tarragon Theatre in Toronto, Ontario. It made its U.S. debut in 2001 at the Wilma Theater in Philadelphia, Pennsylvania.

About The Author
Jason Sherman was born in Montreal, Quebec on July 28, 1962. He moved to Toronto where he lives now. He graduated from York University in 1985 and then started What Publishing in 1985 with Kevin Connolly.  Jason was the editor of What magazine. Also Sherman has won a Governors General Award in 1995 for his play Three in the Back. As well he won a Floyd S. Chalmers Canadian Play Award in 1993 for his play The League of Nathans. “Of his approach to his work, he told CBC (November 2, 1999), 'A great quote Charles Ludlum has is: 'If you are going to tell people the truth, you better make them laugh.' Nobody wants to feel like they're going to be preached at in the theatre. You want to feel like you are going to recognize something of yourself in what's going on stage otherwise, you feel left out.’"(Karch, Pierre)

Works
•	A Place Like Pamela (1991) 
•	To Cry is Not So (1991) 
•	The League of Nathans (1992) 
•	What the Russians Say (1993) 
•	Field (1993) 
•	The Merchant of Showboat (1993) 
•	Three in the Back, Two in the Head (1994) 
•	Reading Hebron (1995) 
•	The Retreat (1996) 
•	None is Too Many (1997) 
•	Patience (1998) 
•	It's All True (1999) An Acre of Time (1999/2000) 
•	Afghanada (2006)

Works cited
Doollie.com The Playwright's Database
Karch, Pierre. “Jason Sherman”. Canadian Theatre Encyclopedia. October 25, 2006
Holland, Julia. “Jason Sherman”. York University. July 28, 2005
Osenlund, Kathryn. Patience. Curtain Up. September 24, 2001
Rush, David. A Student Guide to Play Analysis . Southern Illinois University Press. Carbondale, 2005.
Sherman, Jason. Patience. Playwright Canada Press. Toronto, Ontario, 1998
“Why are Jewish Men so Depressed? Crosscurrent Winter 2002/03”. Center for Addiction and Mental Health. February 21, 2005.

1998 plays
Canadian plays